The blackspot seabream (Pagellus bogaraveo), also known as the red seabream and as the besugo, is a marine ray-finned fish species in family Sparidae. It is widespread in the Eastern Atlantic from Norway to Mauritania, including Macaronesia and the  western Mediterranean.

Description
The blackspot seabream is a fish with a moderately deep body, a rounded snout and large eyes which have a diameter greater than the length of the snout. It has small sharp teeth and larger, flatter teeth set into the sides of the jaws. It has a long dorsal fin which has 12 spines in the anterior portion and 12–13 branched rays in the posterior portion. The shorter anal fin has three spines and 12–13 branched rays. The pectoral fins are relatively long and are pointed at their tips. The back and upper flanks are reddish in colour and the lower part of the body is silvery with a pinkish tinge. There is a black spot situated directly above the base of the pectoral fin.

Distribution
The blackspot seabream is largely found in the waters of the eastern North Atlantic from Norway south to Cape Blanc in Mauritania, its range extends into the western Mediterranean as far as the Strait of Sicily and the Adriatic. It is also found around the Canary Islands and the Azores and has been recorded off Iceland.

Habitat and biology
The blackspot seabream occurs in inshore waters above different types of substrates, rocks, sand and mud. The young fish are found near the coast while the adults are found on the continental slope, particularly over areas with a muddy substrate. This is an omnivorous species which has a diverse diet of crustaceans, molluscs, and small fish. It can eat plant matter as well.

The blackspot seabream is a protoandrous hermaphrodite, early in its lifecycle it is male then between the ages of 2 and 7, however, it becomes female. Spawning occurs throughout the year, with a peaks dependent on location. it is August to October off the British Isles and January to April in the Bay of Biscay. Farther south the spawning peaks are in January to March off Morocco and in January to May in the Mediterranean). A femaleof standard length  can lay 70,000–500,000 eggs. It is a gregarious species which migrates to coastal waters to spawn.

Human utilisation
The blackspot sea bream is an important food fish which is marketed fresh and frozen around the Mediterranean. Fishing is done using trawls, trammel nets and bottom long lines. Fishing for this species is done on a semi-industrial basis or by artisanal fishermen, it is also a sport fish.  It regularly available in the fish markets of France, Spain, Morocco and Italy, however it is only occasionally found in such markets in Sicily, Tunisia, Greece and Turkey. It was heavily exploited by the artisanal fleet of the Strait of Gibraltar where boats from Andalusia fished for blackspot seabream using a vertical deep water longline called a voracera which was baited with small sardines. Today, this species commands a high price in the Spanish domestic market as a result of overfishing, and a near monopoly of landings in Tarifa and this has resulted in an increase in imported fish from Portugal and Morocco. It has also been used to produce fishmeal and oil. It is grown in aquaculture off Spain.

References

Pagellus
Commercial fish
Fish of the East Atlantic
Marine fish of Europe
Fish of the Mediterranean Sea
Fish described in 1768
Taxa named by Morten Thrane Brünnich